The year 1968 in science and technology involved some significant events, listed below.

Astronomy
 Thomas Gold explains the recently discovered radio pulsars as rapidly rotating neutron stars; subsequent observations confirm the suggestion.

Computer science
 April – First book printed completely using electronic composition, the United States edition of Andrew Garve's thriller The Long Short Cut.
 July 18 – The semiconductor chip company Intel is founded by Gordon E. Moore and Robert Noyce in Mountain View, California.
 December 9 – In what becomes retrospectively known as "The Mother of All Demos", Douglas Engelbart of Stanford Research Institute's Augmentation Research Center demonstrates for the first time the computer mouse, the video conference, teleconferencing, hypertext, word processing, hypermedia, object addressing, the dynamic linker and a collaborative real-time editor using NLS.

Mathematics
 Beniamino Segre describes a version of the tennis ball theorem.

Medicine
 January 2 – Dr. Christiaan Barnard performs the second successful human heart transplant, in South Africa, on Philip Blaiberg, who survives for nineteen months.
 November – Outbreak of acute gastroenteritis among schoolchildren in Norwalk, Ohio, caused by "Norwalk agent", the first identified norovirus.
 Publication of a Harvard committee report on irreversible coma establishes a paradigm for defining brain death. France becomes the first European country to adopt brain death as a legal definition (or indicator) of death.
 Doctors perform the first successful bone marrow transplant, to treat severe combined immunodeficiency (SCID).
 DiGeorge syndrome is first described by pediatric endocrinologist Angelo DiGeorge.

Physics
 Georges Charpak develops the multiwire proportional chamber for particle detection at CERN.

Psychology
 John Darley and Bibb Latané demonstrate the bystander effect.
 Walter Mischel publishes Personality and Assessment.

Robotics
 January – Miomir Vukobratović proposes Zero Moment Point, a theoretical model to explain biped locomotion.

Space exploration
 September 15–22 – Zond program: Soviet spacecraft Zond 5 becomes the first vehicle to circle the Moon (September 18) and return to splashdown on Earth. It also carries the first living organisms to circle the Moon, including two Russian tortoises, Piophila, mealworms, plants and bacteria.
 October 11 – Apollo program: NASA launches Apollo 7, the first manned Apollo mission, with astronauts Wally Schirra, Donn Fulton Eisele and R. Walter Cunningham aboard. Goals for the mission include the first live television broadcast from orbit and testing the lunar module docking maneuver.
 December 24 – Apollo 8 enters Moon orbit. Frank Borman, Jim Lovell and William A. Anders are the first humans to see the far side of the Moon and planet Earth as a whole. Anders photographs Earthrise.

Technology
 June 6 – Roy Jacuzzi is granted a patent for the Jacuzzi whirlpool hot tub in the United States.

Events
 April 4 – United States theatrical release of Stanley Kubrick's film 2001: A Space Odyssey, based on a story by Arthur C. Clarke.

Publications
 James D. Watson – The Double Helix: A Personal Account of the Discovery of the Structure of DNA.

Awards
 Nobel Prizes
 Physics – Luis Alvarez
 Chemistry – Lars Onsager
 Medicine – Robert W. Holley, Har Gobind Khorana, Marshall W. Nirenberg
 Turing Award – Richard Hamming

Births
 January 11 – Benjamin List, German organic chemist, recipient of 2021 Nobel Prize in Chemistry
 March 3 – Brian Cox, English physicist and science communicator, previously rock keyboardist
 March 9 – Maggie Aderin-Pocock, English space scientist and science educator
 March 16 – David MacMillan, Scottish-born organic chemist, recipient of 2021 Nobel Prize in Chemistry
 May 3 – Jerry Tomlinson, Greatest Fire Chief Ever 
 June 30 – Samantha Tross, Guyanese-born British orthopedic surgeon
 September 30 – Bennet Omalu, Nigerian physician, forensic pathologist and neuropathologist 
 December 11 – Emmanuelle Charpentier, French biochemist, recipient of 2020 Nobel Prize in Chemistry

Deaths
 January 6 – Xu Shunshou (born 1917), Chinese aeronautical engineer.
 February 22 – May Smith (born 1879), English experimental psychologist.
 March 27 – Yuri Gagarin (born 1934), Russian cosmonaut, the first man in space.
 April 1 – Lev Davidovich Landau (born 1908), Russian physicist.
 June 21 – Constance Georgina Tardrew (born 1883), South African botanist.
 July 22 – Muthulakshmi Reddi (born 1886), Indian physician and social reformer.
 July 28 – Otto Hahn (born 1879), German chemist, recipient of 1944 Nobel Prize in Chemistry.
 October 27 – Lise Meitner (born 1878), German physicist, discoverer in 1939, with Otto Hahn, of nuclear fission.
 November 8 – Chika Kuroda (born 1884), Japanese chemist.

References

 
20th century in science
1960s in science